General Hull may refer to:

Charles Hull (British Army officer) (1865–1920), British Army major general
Chester Hull (1919–2012), Canadian Forces lieutenant general
Harris Hull (1909–1993), U.S. Air Force brigadier general
John A. Hull (1874–1944), U.S. Army major general
John E. Hull (1895–1975), U.S. Army general
Richard Hull (1907–1989), British Army general
William Hull (1753–1825), U.S. Army brigadier general